Castle Donington and Shardlow railway station served the market town of Castle Donington, Leicestershire and the village of Shardlow, Derbyshire.

History
It opened on 6 December 1869 as Castle Donington, when the Midland Railway opened the Weston, Castle Donington and Trent branch.

It was renamed Castle Donington and Shardlow on 13 June 1901 before being closed to passengers on 21 September 1930. It was closed to freight in 1967 and was demolished soon after.

Services

References

Railway stations in Great Britain opened in 1869
Railway stations in Great Britain closed in 1930
Disused railway stations in Leicestershire